Actinidia suberifolia is a species of plant in the Actinidiaceae family. It is endemic to China.

References

suberifolia
Endemic flora of China
Vulnerable plants
Taxonomy articles created by Polbot